Maylandia callainos (sometimes referred to as cobalt zebra, cobalt blue mbuna or cobalt blue zebra cichlid) is a species of cichlid endemic to Lake Malawi where they only occurred naturally in Nkhata Bay though it has now been introduced to other locations.  This species can reach a length of  SL.  It can also be found in the aquarium trade. Maylandia callainos was formally named Pseudotropheus callainos and is often referred as such in the scientific literature.

See also
List of freshwater aquarium fish species

References

callainos
Fish of Lake Malawi
Fish of Malawi
Fish described in 1992
Taxa named by Jay Richard Stauffer Jr.
Taxobox binomials not recognized by IUCN
Taxonomy articles created by Polbot